Sweet Inspiration is the first of two studio albums by the London gospel choir, The Inspirational Choir. It was released in 1985 and reached number 59 on the UK Album Chart and spent four weeks in the charts. Two singles were released from the album, "Abide with Me", which reached number 36 on the UK Singles Chart, and "I've Got a Feeling".

Track listing

Personnel 
 The Inspirational Choir – choir
 Royal Choral Society – additional choir on "Abide with Me"
 Ricky Simpson – bass guitar
 Luke Tunney, Martin Dobson, Pete Thoms, Steve Gregory – brass section
 Soloman Read – drums
 John Francis – keyboards
 Bob Carter, Phil Sawyer, Richard Gillinson, Trevor Bastow – synthesizer
 Mitch Dalton, Ronnie Simpson – guitars
 Don Reedman, Jeff Jarratt – record producer
 John Kurlander, John Timperley, Mark Chamberlain, Mark Maguire, Mike Jarratt, Mike Ross, Peter Mew – engineers
 Rosław Szaybo – album cover design

References

External links 
 Sweet Inspiration at Discogs

1985 debut albums
Portrait Records albums
The Inspirational Choir of the Pentecostal First Born Church of the Living God albums